The Agua Fria River (Spanish for "cold water") is a  long intermittent stream which flows generally south from  east-northeast of Prescott in the U.S. state of Arizona. Prescott draws much of its municipal water supply from the upper Agua Fria watershed. The Agua Fria runs through the Agua Fria National Monument. The river then flows through a small canyon called "Black Canyon" into Lake Pleasant, a popular recreation area near Peoria, Arizona.
(There is a large "Black Canyon" on the Colorado River along the Arizona–Nevada border.)

During rainy weather and at times when water is flowing in the intermittent Agua Fria River, it discharges into the Gila River, which also only flows during wet periods of the year.

It serves to recharge underground aquifers in this area, and ends at Lake Pleasant, Phoenix.

Variant names
According to the Geographic Names Information System, it has also been known historically as:
 Agua Fria Creek
 Agua Frie

Course
The Agua Fria River rises about 1.5 miles northeast of Granite Dells, Arizona and then flows south to join the Gila River about 1 mile south of Goodyear, Arizona.

Watershed
Agua Fria River drains  of area, receives about 16.4 in/year of precipitation, has a wetness index of 415.05, and is about 11% forested.

See also
 List of rivers of Arizona
 Indian Mesa

References

External links 

 Maricopa Audubon Society Page on the Agua Fria Wildlife Preserve
 Agua Fria River Master Plan, by Maricopa County
 Agua Fria – New River Natural Resource Conservation District
 Photos taken along the Agua Fria River
 Bureau of Land Management Page on the Agua Fria National Monument

Rivers of Arizona
Prescott, Arizona
Rivers of Maricopa County, Arizona
Rivers of Yavapai County, Arizona
Tributaries of the Gila River